Vittore "Rino" Martini (22 April 1912 – 17 January 1993) was an Italian footballer who played as a goalkeeper and a later manager.

Club career
Martini began his football career in 1931 at Ternana, playing as a goalkeeper. In 1932 he was transferred to Juventus Trapani for one season and then he played at U.S. Catanzaro 1929 for three years, where he won his only title of his career, the Serie C1 in 1936. Then he made the big step of his career joining the hometown club, Milan, which it is also the peak moment in his career. At Milan he played for three seasons as a back-up goalkeeper, before returning to the club that he first played, Ternana for one season. Afterwards, he spent another season at Savona He was distinguished by his power with a characteristic in his career that he scored with direct volleys. Even today he holds the goalscoring record for a Serie B goalkeeper, after as he scored twice against Siena, the first with a penalty and the second with a direct volley. In 1941 he moved to Liguria, where he played for a season. In total he made 18 appearances as a starter in Serie A, during difficult times for Italy and football, as the World War II raged and the leagues certainly took a back seat. In 1943 he played Legnano for a year and took a break before returning to football in 1946 for a season with Marsala, where he ended his playing career in 1956.

Managerial career
A year and a half after his retirement as a footballer Martini, became the manager of Belenenses, replacing Alejandro Scopelli. In Lisbon he actually began his coaching career and as a practisioner of the Italian school of football, he emphasized on defense, losing the Lisbon Championship and finishing third in the then Taça de Portugal. He departed from the club in 1950.

The next stop in his career was Vitória Setúbal in 1955, where he finished third in the Taça Ribeiro dos Reis and afterwards cames the call from Greece. Almost at the same time as AEK Athens, the HFF, recognizing his ability to fix the defensive line, entrusted him with the Greece national team, where however, he did not manage to achieve similar results. The heavy defeat 7–1 on 1 October 1958 for the qualifiers of the 1960 European Nations' Cup in Paris by the organizer France of Kopa, Fontaine and Wisniewski, who tore apart the Greek defense and 9 days later, under the weight of the outcry, Martini was fired. He ended his spell in Greece with 2 wins a draw and 4 defeats in 7 games with 8–17 goals.

The then president of AEK Athens, Nikos Goumas, after their unsuccessful previous season, was determined to give his team back their competitive identity that allowed them to star and called the Italian coach who was now famous apart from his good defensive game and for his discipline. Martini indeed made an unbreakable team at the back, the team finishing second in the Athens FCA Championship, having the best defense in the group conceding only 14 goals. AEK suffered a 1–0 defeat by Fostiras and a draw against Egaleo. However, he gave joy to the fans of the team with the victory in the derby against Panathnikos and also the victory over Apollon Athens  by 4–0 in at home and 1–2 away from home. In the Pahellenic Championship that took place afterwards, the many draws they achieved cost AEK the title as they finished second again behind the Olympiacos. After the end of the championship he left AEK Athens and Greece.

In 1959 he hard a brief spell at Chiasso. The beginning of the 60's found him wandering and for three and a half seasons unemployed, until he was called to the Italian-Swiss border by the Swiss second division Chiasso to replace the technical duo of Carlo Rigotti and Tullio Grassi. This was his last professional involvement in football, before he retired from football.

Personal life
After his retirent from football, Martini became a businessman in Lombardy. He died on 17 January 1993.

Honours

As a player
U.S. Catanzaro 1929
Serie C1: 1935–36 (Girone D)

References

External links
Statistics at Wikicalcioitalia.info
Vittore Martini at Magliarossonera.it
Vittore Martini at Calciozz.it
Vittore Martini at Scoresway.com

1912 births
1993 deaths
People from Rho, Lombardy
Footballers from Lombardy
Italian footballers
Serie A players
Serie B players
Serie C players
Ternana Calcio players
Trapani Calcio players
U.S. Catanzaro 1929 players
A.C. Milan players
Savona F.B.C. players
A.C. Legnano players
Association football goalkeepers
Italian football managers
C.F. Os Belenenses managers
Vitória F.C. managers
Greece national football team managers
AEK Athens F.C. managers
Vigevano Calcio managers
FC Chiasso managers
Italian expatriate football managers
Expatriate football managers in Portugal
Italian expatriate sportspeople in Portugal
Expatriate football managers in Greece
Italian expatriate sportspeople in Greece